Terror Express (lit. "The girl in the sleeping car") is a 1979  Italian crime film directed by  Ferdinando Baldi and starring Silvia Dionisio. The screenplay was written by George Eastman.

Plot 
A dozen passengers find themselves on some carriages of a train on a long trip. Among them a prostitute, a few couples, some girls, a policeman and three criminals; the latter steal the gun from the policeman and take control of some coaches, committing murders, rapes and humiliation. But an unexpected stop will give Peter, a former convict, the opportunity for revenge.

Cast 

 Silvia Dionisio as Giulia
 Werner Pochath as  Elio
 Zora Kerova as  Anna
 Venantino Venantini as  Anna's Husband
 Andrea Scotti as  Willis
 Carlo De Mejo as  David
  Gianluigi Chirizzi as Peter
  Giancarlo Maestri as The Policeman

References

External links

Italian crime thriller films
Films set on trains
Films directed by Ferdinando Baldi
1970s crime thriller films
Films scored by Marcello Giombini
1970s Italian-language films
1970s Italian films